The Genesis Children is a 1972 art film by Lyric Films International.

The movie premiered in August 1972 in Los Angeles, but was withdrawn within a few weeks due to lack of public acceptance. Although it was called "very benign" by the US rating administration, it received an X rating. It has remained controversial ever since, because of some lengthy full nudity scenes of teenage and preteen boys.

Synopsis

The plot of the movie is non-chronological, as it attempts to mimick the spontaneity of juvenile thinking, and thus at first sight may appear convoluted and rather loose.

The story is about eight students of an International School in Rome, who follow a want ad placed by some mysterious man: 'Wanted: boys to act in a play, to be performed before God.' This leads them to a splendid cove at the Palinuro natural arch in southern Italy, where in the beginning they appear overwhelmed by a sensation of paradisiacal ease and freedom. In this initial stage, most of the nudity scenes appear (about six minutes, distributed over the first half hour). No sexual innuendos are involved; rather, these scenes are presented as a sort of dream-like 'sacred dance' (see below). In the course of the following days, as problems come up, clothing is more and more restored, and finally the group divides, with five of the boys abandoning their play and three of them staying.

In the course of the 'play', the boys adventure into diverse, sometimes bizarre, actions, to overcome growing 'boredom, hunger and homesickness' (as their problems are diagnosed by one of them) and also fear.

Religion in the film 
As to judge from some of the books he has written, author and director Anthony Aikman (1942-2011) appears to have been a deeply religious person, albeit not in the sense of a specific religious denomination. Apart from the text of the ad, also the very last sentences of the film expose it as a religious parable: 'Your play before God is completed.' − 'In the beginning there was God, but then man created God in his own image.' The 'sacred dance' scenes can evoke allusions to Psalm 126. In addition, here and only here the music switches to church music of various origins (plainsong, church bells, Russian orthodox). Less directly, the religious character is also evidenced by the themes of fear, confidence and coming home, which play an important role.

Rating

The MPAA film classification database lists an X rating for the film. Aaron Stern, director of MPAA's code and rating administration stated 'The Genesis Children is really a very benign film. It was only the cumulative amount of nudity and the closeup shots of the pelvic area that brought about the X decision. Even the violence of the scene in which the boys attack the bus is well within the R category.'

External links
 
 Anthony Aikman's Official Website

See also
 List of American films of 1972

References

1972 films
American coming-of-age drama films
1972 drama films
American independent films
1972 independent films
1970s coming-of-age drama films
Films scored by Jerry Styner
Films set in the Mediterranean Sea
Films set on beaches
1970s English-language films
1970s American films